Abelardo Aguilar, was a Filipino doctor from Iloilo, Philippines who worked as a researcher in Eli Lilly and Company.

Discovery of Erythromycin

In 1949, Aguilar was testing soil samples from his backyard and had discovered a method to formulate Erythromycin.

Saccharopolyspora erythraea, a strain of bacteria was isolated and lead to his discovery and to the development of Erythromycin, an antibiotic used today.

Aguilar discovered a method to formulate Erythromycin while testing soil samples from his backyard

Dr. Abelardo Aguilar isolated a strain of bacteria which lead to the development of Erythromycin, a broad-spectrum antibiotic used to treat and prevent a wide range of infections.

Eli Lilly marketed Erythromycin under the brand name Ilosone. Unfortunately, Aguilar received no credit or compensation for his discovery.

References

Living people
Filipino medical doctors
Antibiotics
Year of birth missing (living people)